This article lists the results for the New Caledonia national football team from 1951 to 1999.

Key

Key to matches
Att. = Match attendance
(H) = Home ground
(A) = Away ground
(N) = Neutral ground

Key to record by opponent
Pld = Games played
W = Games won
D = Games drawn
L = Games lost
GF = Goals for
GA = Goals against

Results

New Caledonia's score is shown first in each case.

Notes

Record by opponent

References

1951–99